The Executive Council of Limpopo is the cabinet of the executive branch of the provincial government in the South African province of Limpopo. The Members of the Executive Council (MECs) are appointed from among the members of the Limpopo Provincial Legislature by the Premier of Limpopo, an office held since July 2013 by Stan Mathabatha.

Mathale premiership: 2009–2013 
Cassel Mathale was elected to his first full term as Premier in the 2009 general election and on 6 May 2009 announced his new Executive Council, in which seven of ten MECs were new to the provincial cabinet. In August 2009, Public Works MEC Pandelani Ramagoma died and was replaced by George Phadagi. However, Phadagi and others were moved to new portfolios on 28 January 2011, when a cabinet reshuffle was announced. A subsequent reshuffle was announced on 13 March 2012 and saw four ministers exit the Executive Council: Phadagi, Dikeledi Magadzi, and Joyce Mashamba were fired, while Soviet Lekganyane resigned pursuant to his election as Provincial Secretary of the Limpopo ANC.

Mathabatha premiership

First term: 2013–2014 
Stan Mathabatha was elected Premier in July 2013 after the ANC asked Mathale resign. On 19 July 2013, he announced the composition of his first Executive Council, firing eight of Mathale's ten MECs; only Dickson Masemola and Dipuo Letsatsi-Duba retained their spots in the cabinet, although they were moved to new portfolios.

Second term: 2014–2019 
In the 2014 general election, Mathabatha was elected to a full term as Premier and announced his new Executive Council, which disbanded the former roads and transport portfolio, merging roads with safety and liaison and roads with public works. On 27 May 2015, he announced a reshuffle affecting only three portfolios (education, health, and treasury); a vacancy had arisen after the death of Education MEC Thembisile Nwedamutswu in January 2015, and Rudolph Phala was the only MEC to be fired. Another three-portfolio reshuffle was announced on 15 September 2016, two months after the death of Agriculture MEC Joy Matshoge.  

Mathabatha effected a more comprehensive reshuffle in October 2017 ahead of the ANC's 54th National Conference; his critics, including in the provincial ANC Youth League, labelled the reshuffle a purge of supporters of national President Jacob Zuma because it entailed demotions for Zuma loyalists, such as Mapula Mokaba-Phukwana and Makoma Makhurupetje. Finally, in July 2018, Mathabatha made two appointments to fill vacancies created by the death of Agriculture MEC Joyce Mashamba and the resignation of Sports, Arts and Culture MEC Onicca Moloi.

Third term: 2019–present 

On 22 May 2019, shortly after he was re-elected in the 2019 general election, Premier Mathabatha announced his new Executive Council, with wide-ranging changes from the cabinet installed in his previous term. On 23 March 2020, he announced his first second-term reshuffle, a minor reshuffle affecting two departments in which one MEC, Monicca Mochadi, was fired.

In June 2022, Mathabatha was re-elected to a third term as ANC Provincial Chairperson in a hotly contested party elective conference. Although he said after the conference that internal party competition would not lead him to reshuffle his executive, he announced a reshuffle at the end of the same month. In the reshuffle, Public Works MEC Dickson Masemola swapped portfolios with Social Development MEC Nkakareng Rakgoale, while Education MEC Polly Boshielo swapped portfolios with Community Safety MEC Mavhungu Lerule-Ramakhanya. This was perceived as a demotion for Masemola and Boshielo and was linked to the ANC elective conference, at which Masemola had run against Mathabatha. Then, in October 2022, Mathabatha announced a wider-ranging reshuffle, affecting five departments, in which he fired Masemola and Boshielo outright; he also sacked the MEC for Sports, Arts and Culture, Thandi Moraka, who, like Masemola and Boshielo, had failed to gain re-election to the ANC Provincial Executive Committee at the party conference in June.

See also 

 Template: Limpopo Executive Council
 Government of South Africa
 Constitution of South Africa

References 

Government of Limpopo